Nikki Phillips (born 1983) is a New Zealand model, blogger, and television host.

Phillips was born in Auckland. She started modelling at age 14 and moved to Australia in 2002. She appeared as a special guest judge in the first series of New Zealand's Next Top Model in 2009. In December 2015 she began hosting Garage Movie Block, a Sky Television show in New Zealand.

Phillips married her husband Dane Rumble in Bali in 2014.

References

External links
 

1983 births
Living people
New Zealand female models
New Zealand emigrants to Australia
People from Auckland
New Zealand bloggers
New Zealand women bloggers
New Zealand television presenters
21st-century New Zealand women writers
New Zealand women television presenters